Mumbai – Pune passenger was a daily slow passenger train connecting the cities of Mumbai and Pune. This train originated from Chhatrapati Shivaji Maharaj Terminus and terminated at Pune Junction. This train used to travel via Kalyan and used to stop at all stations on the route. However this was shut down due to inconvenience by Central Railway because this created congestion to Mumbai CST–Pandharpur Fast Passenger, Mumbai CST–Bijapur Fast Passenger and Mumbai CST–Sainagar Shirdi Fast Passenger. It used to operate as 1325 from Mumbai to Pune and 1326 from Pune to Mumbai. It used to leave Mumbai at 22:50 and leave Pune at 23:40.

See also
 Mumbai CST–Sainagar Shirdi Fast Passenger
 Mumbai CST–Pandharpur Fast Passenger
 Sister trains Mumbai–Pune:
 Via Kalyan
 Deccan Express
 Deccan Queen
 Indrayani Express
 Mumbai–Pune Intercity Express
 Sinhagad Express
 Via Panvel
 Pragati Express
 Defunct
 Poona Mail
 Mumbai–Pune Shatabdi Express

External links
 Last known time table of Mumbai–Pune Passenger
 Mumbai–Pune train timings Pune Dairy

Transport in Pune
Transport in Mumbai
Mumbai–Pune trains